Robert Gillespie (born 1933) is a French-born British actor.

Robert, Bob or Bobby Gillespie may also refer to:

Robert Gillespie (preacher), 17th-century Scottish Presbyterian preacher
Robert Rollo Gillespie (1766–1814), officer of the Irish Dragoons
Robert Addison Gillespie (1815–1846), Texas Ranger; Gillespie County, Texas named for him
Robert Gillespie (Scottish footballer) (1901–1960), Queen's Park FC and Scotland player
Robert Pollock Gillespie (1903–1977), Scottish mathematician
Robert G. Gillespie (1903–1983), Mississippi Supreme Court Justice
Robert Gillespie (footballer, born 1904) (1904–1971), English soccer player
Bob Gillespie (1919–2001), American baseball player
Bobby Gillespie (born 1962), Scottish musician
Robert Gillespie (American football) (born 1979), American NFL player